NANA Regional Corporation, Inc. (NANA) is one of thirteen Alaska Native Regional Corporations created under the Alaska Native Claims Settlement Act of 1971 (ANCSA) in settlement of Alaska Native land claims.  NANA was incorporated in Alaska on June 7, 1972. NANA is a for-profit corporation with a land base in the Kotzebue area in northwest Alaska. Its corporate office is in Kotzebue, Alaska. NANA's Alaska Native shareholders are of Inupiat descent.

The Northwest Arctic Native Association was NANA's predecessor, and played a key role in the effort to resolve Alaska Native land claims that led to passage of ANCSA. However, NANA is not an acronym today.

According to the 2021 Arctic Environmental Responsibility Index (AERI), NANA Regional Corporation is ranked no. 20 among 120 oil, gas, and mining companies involved in resource extraction north of the Arctic Circle.

Controversies 
In 2015, NANA spilled 61 barrels of oil (2,561 gallons) onto the wet tundra of Alaska, where it flowed 200 yards into a nearby stream. The EPA fined NANA $24,500 for this act of pollution and they were forced to pay approximately $2,000,000 in compliance costs.

Corporate governance

Board of directors
NANA is a shareholder-managed corporation that is guided by a Board of Directors, composed of Inupiat shareholders, and a senior management team]. The 23 member NANA Regional Corporation, Inc. Board is elected solely by NANA shareholders. It is made up of two Iñupiat shareholder board members from each NANA village (with the exception of Kotzebue with one board seat) and an Elder Advisor.

Shareholders
Most of NANA's approximately 15,000 shareholders are Alaska Natives of Inupiat descent. As an ANCSA corporation, NANA has no publicly traded stock and its shares cannot legally be sold, though Class A, B and C stocks can be inherited or gifted. Unlike other American corporations, NANA - as an Alaska Native Corporation, has economic, social and cultural responsibilities to its shareholders.

Lands

Until 1971, the issue of land ownership in Alaska was divisive. Oil was discovered on Alaska's North Slope and Alaska Native peoples, including the Iñupiat of northwest Alaska, worried about maintaining rights to traditional lands and the ability to protect their valuable subsistence resources. The passage of the Alaska Native Claims Settlement Act (or ANCSA) helped resolve many of the issues surrounding land rights.

ANCSA created 12 regional corporations in Alaska (a 13th was added later), and the state and Alaska Native groups worked together to select lands for each region. Each of these regions formed a for-profit corporation to manage these land rights.

Today, NANA owns , or approximately 9.4 percent of the  that comprise the NANA region. NANA lands encompass an area that is roughly the size of Indiana.

In 1972, a merger of the area’s regional corporation and ten of the eleven village corporations resulted in NANA’s ownership of both the surface and subsurface acreage, with the exception of the surface acreage Kikiktagruk Iñupiat Corporation (KIC) retained.

The land selection and conveyance process is now largely completed, but the work of our Lands Department continues to ensure that our rights are never again in question.

NANA-owned lands are managed by the NANA Lands and Regional Affairs Department.

Subsidiaries 
NANA subsidiaries include:
 NANA Development Corporation (NDC) oversees NANA business activity and cultivates developmental opportunities for NANA shareholders.
Akima is a holding company of federal and commercial service providers. On November 5, 2017, Akima received press coverage for terminating the employment of a woman that Akima alleged posted obscenities on social media.  Akima was criticized for being inconsistent as another employee posted obscene language on social media but was not disciplined.
 Red Dog mine. Northwest Arctic Region of Alaska. Zinc mine on NANA-owned land; operated in partnership with Teck Alaska. Many of NANA's companies and partners provide services for the mine, such as facilities management, housekeeping and food service.

References

External links
 

1972 establishments in Alaska
Alaska Native regional corporations
Non-renewable resource companies established in 1972
Northwest Arctic Borough, Alaska
Hospitality companies established in 1972